Ichabod and I is the debut album by British indie rock band The Boo Radleys, released in 1990 on the indie label Action Records. It has never been released on CD. Steve Hewitt, the drummer for this album, would later join Placebo.

Track listing

Personnel
The Boo Radleys
Sice - vocals
Steve Hewitt - drums, percussion
Tim Brown - bass guitar, keyboards
Martin Carr - guitar, keyboards, vocals

References

1990 albums
The Boo Radleys albums